HKU is a station on the Hong Kong MTR  located in the Shek Tong Tsui neighbourhood of Western, Hong Kong. It is named after the University of Hong Kong, which is served by the station.

Part of the West Island line, a westward extension to the existing , HKU station opened on 28 December 2014 along with Kennedy Town station.

History
Before the 1980s, an MTR station by the name of Whitty (屈地) was planned to be built underground at Des Voeux Road West, near Ka On Street, Whitty Street and Hill Road. Lots at Chong Yip Centre and Pacific Plaza were reserved for future station exits and concourse. This was part of a planned extension of the Island line that was never built, but which was superseded by the West Island Line project, of which HKU station forms a part.

In 2009, the design and architecture was awarded to Aedas in joint venture with AECOM. The construction work was awarded to Gammon Construction, (half owned by Balfour Beatty) for 4.7 billion HK dollars. Construction commenced in 2010 and was completed in 2014.

HKU station opened on 28 December 2014.

Naming 
There were disputes among locals and district councillors over the station's name. Some suggested to restore the previous official name "Belcher" (bou2 ceoi3) after The Belcher's, a housing development in the area, as well as Belcher Street and Belcher Bay. Some also suggested "Shek Tong Tsui", after the area the station would serve.

In August 2009, MTR named the station "Hong Kong University". The latest revision changed the English name to "HKU", the abbreviation of The University of Hong Kong nearby.

Station layout

The station is located under Pok Fu Lam Road. It has two tracks and one center island platform. In addition, the MTR has built elevators to link HKU station to the University of Hong Kong.

HKU station features designated refuge areas, to which passengers can be evacuated in case of emergency. Refuge areas are pressurised and equipped with fire systems including sprinklers and fire curtains, and independent power supply units. HKU station is the first station in the MTR network to apply such shelter design and the use of lifts to reach safety.

Exits
HKU station has six exits. As exits A1, A2 and C1 are situated deep underneath Mid-Levels, only express lifts are used to transport passengers. This makes HKU station the first to feature lift-only exits.

Exits A1 and A2 are served by a total of eight lifts with a maximum load of 1,800 kg per lift. Exit C1 is served by four lifts with a capacity of 2,100 kg each.
A1: Pok Fu Lam Road (near Haking Wong Building), St. Paul's College, St. Stephen's Church College 
A2: The University of Hong Kong Main Campus, Chow Yei Ching Building, Haking Wong Building 
B1: Whitty Street, Chong Yip Shopping Centre, Shek Tong Tsui Municipal Services Building
B2: Hill Road, Hong Kong Plaza, JEN Hong Kong by Shangri-La 
C1: The Belcher's, Pok Fu Lam Road, The University of Hong Kong Centennial Campus 
C2: Belcher's Street, Harbour One, The Westwood

Future
HKU station is proposed to be an interchange station for the Island line and the South Island line (West). The platforms of the South Island line (West) will be built under those of the Island line.

References

Railway stations in Hong Kong opened in 2014
MTR stations on Hong Kong Island
Island line (MTR)
West Island line
South Island line (West)
Shek Tong Tsui
Railway stations at university and college campuses